Podolkhi is a rural locality (a selo) and the administrative center of Podoleshenskoye Rural Settlement, Prokhorovsky District, Belgorod Oblast, Russia. The population was 992 as of 2010. There are 11 streets.

Geography 
Podolkhi is located 18 km southeast of Prokhorovka (the district's administrative centre) by road. Domanovka is the nearest rural locality.

References 

Rural localities in Prokhorovsky District
Korochansky Uyezd